Logi Universe (Japanese ロジユニヴァース foaled March 11 2006) is a Japanese Thoroughbred racehorse and sire. As a juvenile in 2008 he was unbeaten in three races including Grade 3 successes in the Sapporo Nisai Stakes, Radio Nikkei Hai Nisei Stakes. In the following spring he won the Yayoi Sho and then rebounded from his first defeat to win the Tokyo Yushun by four lengths. At the end of the season he won the JRA Award for Best Three-Year-Old Colt. His subsequent racing career was plagued by injury and he ran only four times in the next three years before being retired to stud.

Background
Logi Universe is a bay horse bred in Japan by Northern Farm. His sire Neo Universe, a son of the thirteen-time leading sire in Japan Sunday Silence, was a successful Japanese performer, winning the Satsuki Shō and the Tokyo Yūshun, the first two legs of the Japanese Triple Crown in 2003. At stud he has also sired Victoire Pisa and the Satsuki Shō winner Unrivaled. Logi Universe was the first foal of the unraced mare Acoustics who was a granddaughter of the leading racemare Sonic Lady. Sonic Lady was not, technically a Thoroughbred as her female ancestry could not be traced to one of the foundation mares of the breed. She was instead a member of Half-Bred Family 3 whose other members include Quashed and Attraction.

Logi Universe was trained throughout his racing career by Kiyoshi Hagawara and ridden in most of his races by Norihiro Yokoyama.

Racing career

2008: two-year-old season
Logi Universe began his racing career on 6 July at Hanshin Racecourse in a contest for previously unraced horses over 1800 metres and won from eleven opponents. After the summer break the colt was stepped up in class for the Grade 3 Sapporo Nisei Stakes at Sapporo Racecourse and won from Executive. He ended his season with a second Grade 3 victory when he took the Radio Nikkei Hai Nisei Stakes at Hanshin on 27 December.

In the polling to determine the Japanese champion juvenile colt of 2008 Logi Universe received 31 votes and finished runner-up to Seiun Wonder.

2009: three-year-old season
On his first appearance as a three-year-old Logi Universe contested the Grade 2 Yayoi Sho (a major trial for the Satsuki Sho) in which he faced nine opponents headed by Seiun Wonder. He won by two and a half lengths from Mikki Petra with Seiun Wonder only eighth. On 19 April the colt started 7/10 favourite for the Satsuki Sho. He appeared to be well-placed on the final turn but made no impression in the straight and finished fourteenth of the eighteen runners behind Unrivaled. Hagiwara later commented "there are a number of reasons I can think of for the defeat, but we just don't have enough time to go through them one by one".

On 31 May, in front of a 110,000 crowd, Logi Universe was one of eighteen colts to contest the 76th running of the Tokyo Yushun over 2400 metres on soft ground at Tokyo Racecourse. He was made the 6.7/1 second favourite behind Unrivaled whilst the other runners included Seiun Wonder, Apres Un Reve, Reach the Crown and Nakayama Festa. He raced in third place before moving up on the inside to take the lead 400 metres from the finish. He drew away in the closing stages to win by four lengths from Reach the Crown who finished just ahead of Antonio Barows, Nakayama Festa, Apres Un Reve and Schon Wald. The result was well-received by the crowd partly as the popular veteran Yokoyama was winning the race for the first time.

It was hoped that the colt would return in autumn but he developed a muscular problem in his right hind leg and missed the rest of the season with injury. In the JRA Awards for 2009 he was named champion three-year-old colt, taking 237 of the 287 votes.

2010–2012: later career
After a ten-month absence Logi Universe eventually returned and finished sixth in the Nikkei Sho at Nakayama in March. Katsumi Ando took the ride when the colt moved back up to the highest class for the Takarazuka Kinen. Before the race his trainer admitted that the colt was still having problems with "muscle pains" and he ran poorly to finish unplaced behind Nakayama Festa. Logi Universe showed some sign of a return to form on his third and final start of the year when he finished second to Earnestly in the Sapporo Kinen in August.

Logi Universe was off the course for two years before returning for one race as a six-year-old in 2012. He made no impact as he finished tailed-off last of the fourteen runners in the Sapporo Kinen.

Stud career
Logi Universe was retired from racing to become a breeding stallion at the Yushun Stallion Station in 2013.

Pedigree

References 

2006 racehorse births
Racehorses bred in Japan
Racehorses trained in Japan
Thoroughbred family B3